The Aftermath (also known as Zombie Aftermath) is a 1982 science fiction horror independent film directed by Steve Barkett.

While not prosecuted for obscenity, the film was seized and confiscated in the UK under Section 3 of the Obscene Publications Act 1959 during the video nasty panic

Plot

Three astronauts return to Earth after a nuclear holocaust (that also saw biological weapons used), although one dies in a crash landing. The two survivors, Newman (Steve Barkett) and Matthews, encounter some mutants before discovering that Los Angeles has been completely destroyed. Seeking shelter, the men take refuge in an abandoned mansion. Newman later encounters a young boy, Chris, hiding in a museum with the curator (Forrest J Ackerman).

Before the curator passes away from radiation poisoning, Newman takes Chris under his care. While out seeking supplies one day, Newman and Chris encounter Sarah, who is running from a gang of bandits led by Cutter (Sid Haig).

After Sarah's murder, Newman decides to confront the gang at their desert wasteland hideout. After killing Cutter's gang, Newman is fatally wounded by the gang leader, who in turn is shot dead by Chris with a revolver. The boy then walks off alone before the credits roll.

Cast
Steve Barkett as Newman 
Lynne Margulies as Sarah 
Sid Haig as Cutter 
Christopher Barkett as Chris
Alfie Martin as Getman 
Forrest J Ackerman as Museum curator 
Jim Danforth as Astronaut Williams 
Linda Stiegler as Helen
Adrian Torino as Bruce Will
Levi Shanstan as Arnold Swatch / The Mummy
Ramon Sumabal as Brad Pet
Michael Eugene Romero as Silver-ster the Gold
Jerone Meehleib as The lover Boy Irbo
Martin Kearns as Victim
 Dick Miller as Radio Announcer

Release
The film was released in the United States on various VHS labels and in a special edition laserdisc release by the Roan Group. It was released in the UK with the alternate title Zombie Aftermath the film has been released in the United States by VCI ENTERTAINMENT. As of July 2021 it is available to stream on Plex

Reception

Creature Feature gave the movie 3 out of five stars, finding it well written and directed. It also praised the musical score and effects. Fantastic Movie Musings was not as kind, finding the movie script weak and the characters lacking complexity.

See also
List of zombie short films and undead-related projects

References

External links
 

1982 films
1982 horror films
1980s science fiction horror films
American independent films
American science fiction horror films
Films about astronauts
American post-apocalyptic films
American zombie films
1980s English-language films
1980s American films